Rob Rouse (born 1974) is an English comedian.

Overview
Rouse grew up in Gawsworth, Cheshire. He trained as a geography teacher at the University of Sheffield and got into comedy in his final year at university.  Having fully qualified as a teacher, he decided that teaching was not for him after spending two days as a supply teacher. Instead, he decided to move to London to pursue a career in stand-up comedy. Since winning Channel Four's prestigious 'So You Think You're Funny' competition at the Edinburgh Festival in 1998, an award previously won by Phil Kay, Dylan Moran, Lee Mack, Tommy Tiernan and Peter Kay, he has been a regular performer at major venues on both the London and national circuit.

Rouse is married to comedian and author Helen Rutter. The couple have two children and live in the Peak District.

Television work
Rouse started his career in television as a "warm-up" on the hit BBC sitcom Coupling, where he entertained the studio audience between filming.

Rouse starred in the first series of the BBC Three sitcom Grownups and Guilty Pleasures, a new chat show which he hosted. He also has a role (uncredited) in Penelope, a feature film premiered at the Toronto International Film Festival in September 2006.

In 2005 Rouse was one of the presenters of The Friday Night Project, that later became The Sunday Night Project, an entertainment show for Channel 4. He also starred in Spoons, a Channel 4 sketch show.

His other acting work includes a role in Tunnel of Love, a prime time comedy-drama for ITV and a starring role in the BBC3 sitcom The Bunk Bed Boys. Rouse was also a member of the cast of The Pilot Show for E4.

Rouse is also a popular TV panelist and has made appearances on 8 Out of 10 Cats, and Bognor or Bust amongst others.

In 2007 he starred as Robert Thornton in the Paramount Comedy shorts "The Former Ambassador Robert Thornton" 10 episodes. Rouse also stars in Mad Mad World on ITV1 that started in the spring of 2012.

He appears in the BBC series Upstart Crow, a BBC 2 sitcom about Shakespeare, written by Ben Elton, alongside David Mitchell, Harry Enfield, Mark Heap and Liza Tarbuck.

Stand-up comedy
Rouse first made his name on the live circuit, winning Channel 4's prestigious So You Think You're Funny? competition at the Edinburgh Festival in 1998.

As part of the successful trio Big and Daft, Rouse took three shows to the Edinburgh Festival culminating in 2001 with the sell-out Big and Daft Christmas show. Big and Daft went on to host their own weekend show on BBC London Live.

His 2002 solo Edinburgh show was a sell out, gathering positive reviews. The following year he returned to Edinburgh with another hit show and finished the year with a performance at London's Soho Theatre.

Throughout 2004 Rouse continued touring his live show and performed the Melbourne Comedy Festival.

Other work
In 2015, Rouse and Rutter started their comedy self-help podcast Rob and Helen's Date Night, charting a series of odd dates including horse riding, life-drawing in front of a fire, and the couple recording Rage Against the Machine's Killing in the Name, which they recorded live in their garage.

Rouse and Rutter starred in the play The Ladder, written by Rutter, which premiered at the Edinburgh Fringe in 2018. It is based on an accident Rutter had getting her hand stuck in a ladder at home and Rouse's attempts at helping her.

The couple return to Edinburgh in 2019 with their show Funny in Real Life.

Filmography

Film

Television

Radio

Awards
So You Think You're Funny Winner, Edinburgh Festival, 1998

References

External links

How to act Shakespeare, Rouse on Upstart Crow

English male comedians
English television presenters
Living people
1974 births
English male television actors
21st-century English male actors
20th-century English comedians
21st-century English comedians